Kinksi is a village in Lääneranna Parish, Pärnu County, in western Estonia. Kinksi can be found inland of the Suur Straight. Kinski has a local timezone named Europe / Tallinn with an UTC offset of 2 hours and can be found 68 miles (or 109 km) south-west of Estonia's capital city Tallinn. There are a few Unesco world heritage sites found near by, the closest being the Historic Centre (Old Town) of Tallinn. The following locations are considered of local significance: Komsi, Lihula, Varbla, Martna and Taebla. The main language spoken in Kinksi is Estonian, along with several southern dialects such as Võro, Mulgi and Tartu.

References

 

Villages in Pärnu County